Terminator 2: Judgment Day is a 1991 action-adventure game developed by Bits Studios and published by LJN. It is based on the 1991 film of the same name, and was released for the Game Boy. It was praised for its graphics, gameplay, and music.

Gameplay
Terminator 2 is an action-adventure game played across six levels. The player has unlimited ammunition for most of the game. In the first two levels, the player controls John Connor, who is leading a human resistance against Skynet and its machines in 2029. The player travels through Skynet territory and battles numerous machines. The third level is a puzzle game in which John has limited time to reprogram a T-800 Terminator, by rearranging circuitry in the back of its head.

The T-800 is sent to 1990s Los Angeles to protect young John from a T-1000, who has been sent by Skynet to kill him. The player controls the T-800 for subsequent levels. In the fourth level, John and the T-800 ride a motorcycle through a drainage canal to evade the T-1000, who is pursuing them in a semi-truck. The player uses a shotgun to keep the truck back, and must also avoid debris in the canal.

Later, the player infiltrates Cyberdyne Systems to retrieve technology from a previous T-800, while encountering SWAT guards throughout the facility. In the final level, the player faces off against the T-1000 in a steel mill, using either guns or hand-to-hand combat. John's mother, Sarah Connor, appears in between levels to explain the story.

Development and release
Terminator 2 was published by LJN, which acquired the film rights from production company Carolco. The game was developed by Bits Studios, based in the U.K.; it was the first game the company developed entirely in-house, having previously focused on Game Boy and NES ports of games developed by other companies. Bits consulted with the film company, which stated repeatedly that Sarah Connor's "bangs" were too small in the game. Because of regional differences, the development team misunderstood the term and continually made Sarah's breasts larger, before finding out that the film company had been referring to her hair. Arnold Schwarzenegger portrayed the T-800 in the film, although images of his face could not be used in the game for legal reasons. 

The game was released in the U.S. in November 1991, followed by a U.K. release shortly thereafter.

Reception

Terminator 2 was praised for its graphics. Andy Dyer of Total! wrote, "There's a genuine scary feel to the cold, oppresive look of the Skynet buildings, the desolate canal, and that forbidding steel mill". GamePro, though praising the graphics, stated that the action scenes were "a tad small even for the Game Boy".

The gameplay received praise, particularly for its variety. GamePro concluded that it was "basic, good old-fashioned Game Boy fun". Dyer praised the game's pacing, writing that the levels end "just before you get bored or irritated". He further wrote that the game "takes the best bits from the movie" and "cuts out all the boring bits where things weren't getting blown up", concluding, "I only wish all film tie-ins could be as good as this!" N-Force found it to be a "great" film-based game, while Mean Machines considered it one of the best Game Boy games to date. The game's music was also praised.

References

External links
 Terminator 2 at MobyGames

Terminator (franchise) video games
1991 video games
Game Boy games
Game Boy-only games
Video games developed in the United Kingdom
Video games set in Los Angeles
Side-scrolling video games
Single-player video games
Action-adventure games
Video games set in the 1990s
Video games set in the 2020s